The Bangkok Protestant Cemetery is a cemetery catering mainly to the foreign community in Bangkok. To date, the cemetery has over 1800 interments (around 1100 names are legible on extant gravestones), and it is still accepting burials on a limited basis. The burial register is kept by Christ Church Bangkok (11 Convent Road).

There are also a number of Jewish graves here, since before 1997 there was no other place in the city for the small Jewish community to bury their dead. This changed with the opening of the Jewish Cemetery, in a separate property adjacent to this cemetery.

History

The Bangkok Protestant Cemetery was founded by a royal land grant given by King Mongkut on 29 July 1853, to address the need for burial space for Bangkok's growing Protestant community.

Location

The cemetery is located on the banks of the Chao Phraya River just south of the Menam Riverside Hotel, and 1.75 km south of the Saphan Taksin BTS station along Charoen Krung Road. It is very close to the Asiatique night market.

Notable Interments

 Dan Beach Bradley – medical doctor and missionary
 John Taylor Jones – missionary
 Eliza Grew Jones – missionary and wife of J. T. Jones
 William Henry Adelbert Feilding – general of the Coldstream Guards
 Sir John Bush, Admiral – Harbour Master
 Henry Alabaster – advisor to the King of Siam
 John Fennell Belbin, Captain of the SS Bangkok, who died at his post, 1876, aged 34
 Albert Jucker, Consul of Italy, (1844–1885)
 Hamilton King, Envoy Extraordinary and Minister Plenipotentiary of the United States of America, (born St Johns, Newfoundland 1852–1912)
 Caroline Isabella Knox Leonowens – daughter-in-law of Anna Leonowens of The King and I fame.
 Sungkas Thongborisute M.D. FACS (1932–1999) – founder of the Paolo Memorial Hospital
 Brian Charles Dade, Able Seaman, British Royal Navy, of HMS London, died 1965 aged 25
 Friedrich Schaefer, M.D., founder of and surgeon at King Chulalongkorn Memorial Hospital, who died from an infection acquired when operating 1914
 Hans Herzfeld, banker and chief accountant with the Bombay Burma Trading Corporation, who died 1950 aged 57.
 George Dupont (Yod) – A Siamese man who took part in the American Civil War.

References
 Corfield, Justin J., Bangkok: The Protestant Cemetery & Notes on Other Cemeteries in Thailand. Putney: British Association for Cemeteries in South Asia (BACSA), 1997

Notes

External links

 Bangkok Protestant Cemetery (Official Website)
 Protestant Cemetery Bangkok
 Memorial to the early pioneers
 Find A Grave
 Bangkok Protestant Cemetery official site

Cemeteries in Thailand
Anglican cemeteries in Asia
Lutheran cemeteries
Protestant Reformed cemeteries
Buildings and structures in Bangkok
Buildings and structures on the Chao Phraya River